Astathes bimaculata is a species of beetle in the family Cerambycidae. It was described by Johan Christian Fabricius in 1792. It is known from India.

References

B
Beetles described in 1792